Frederick Halliday Peacock (November 23, 1916 – February 15, 2010) was a business man and former provincial level politician from Alberta, Canada. He served as a member of the Legislative Assembly of Alberta from 1971 until 1979.

Political career
Peacock was elected to the Alberta Legislature in the 1971 Alberta general election. He defeated long time Social Credit incumbent Frederick Colborne, to win the new electoral district of Calgary Currie for the Progressive Conservatives. Peacock was re-elected with a landslide majority in the 1975 Alberta general election defeating three other candidates.

During his time in office he served as Minister of Development and Trade.

Late life
Peacock is a current member of the Rotary Club of Calgary South. He is also a current member of the board of directors for the University of Calgary's The Van Horne Institute. He is also President of Peacock Holdings Limited

References

External links
Legislative Assembly of Alberta Members Listing

1916 births
2010 deaths
Members of the Executive Council of Alberta
Politicians from Calgary
Progressive Conservative Association of Alberta MLAs